Benjamin-Blaise Griveaux (born 29 December 1977) is a French politician of La République En Marche! (LREM) who served as Government Spokesman from 2017 to 2019 under Prime Minister Édouard Philippe. From 2017 until 2021, he also served as a member of the National Assembly, representing the 5th constituency of Paris, which encompasses the 3rd and 10th arrondissements.

A former member of the Socialist Party (PS), Griveaux has frequently been described as one of President Emmanuel Macron's closest political allies. He was LREM's candidate for Mayor of Paris in the 2020 municipal election before he withdrew due to a sex scandal and was replaced by Health Minister Agnès Buzyn.

Early life
Griveaux was born in Saint-Rémy. His father is a notary and his mother is a barrister. He studied at Sciences Po, where he was vice-president of the student union and founded a student magazine called L’Autodafé. He graduated in 1999 and continued his studies at HEC Paris, earning a master's degree in 2001. He failed to gain admission to the École nationale d'administration.

Career

Early beginnings
Between 2003 and 2008 Griveaux began working for A Gauche en Europe, a think-tank founded by Dominique Strauss-Khan and directed by Michel Rocard. He worked as an adviser to Strauss-Khan and supported his unsuccessful bid for the leadership of the Socialist Party in 2006. He founded Mediane Conseil, a recruitment consultancy, the same year.

In 2008, Griveaux stood as a Socialist in both the municipal and departmental elections in Chalon-sur-Saône, which took place simultaneously that year. He succeeded in winning a seat as both a municipal councilor for Chalon-sur-Saône and a departmental councilor for Saône-et-Loire. He later became vice-president of the Departmental Council, which was then led by Arnaud Montebourg.
In 2012 he worked on François Hollande's campaign for the presidency and after Hollande's election served as an adviser to Health Minister Marisol Touraine.

Career in the private sector, 2014–2016
In 2014 Griveaux renounced his mandates in order to take up a post with the commercial real estate company Unibail, prompting criticism from a local official. At Unibail he worked as director of communications and public relations. He left the company in October 2016 to work full-time for En Marche!

Career in national politics
Griveaux met Emmanuel Macron in December 2015 through their mutual contact with Ismaël Emelien. He was present in the meetings that founded En Marche! and was appointed a spokesperson for the movement. Griveaux has frequently been described in media as one of Macron's closest political allies.

In the 2017 legislative elections Griveaux stood for La République en Marche! in the fifth constituency of Paris, where his opponent was Seybah Dagoma, a Socialist assembly member since 2012. Griveaux won the seat on 18 June with 56.27% of the vote.

On 21 June 2017 Griveaux was appointed to the second Philippe government as a secretary of state at the Finance and Economy Ministry, a newly created role. The Huffington Post reported the extent of Griveaux's remit is unclear, and that he will serve as deputy or assistant (Fr: adjoint) to Finance Minister Bruno Le Maire.Libération referred to Griveaux as ‘the president’s eyes and ears’ in the upper echelons of the powerful Finance Ministry.

Candidacy of Mayor of Paris, 2019–2020
In March 2019, Griveaux resigned from the office of spokesman in order to run in the Paris mayor's election.

In February 2020 Griveaux abandoned his bid to become mayor of Paris after it was alleged that he had "exchanged intimate mobile phone messages with a young woman and sent her an explicit video of himself masturbating", which was later posted online by Petr Pavlensky. Pavlensky said that Griveaux was "only the first politician that he would target: he had only just begun".

Return to the private sector
In May 2021, Griveaux resigned his parliamentary seat and instead announced leaving active politics.

Controversy
In January 2019, Griveaux had to escape his office after protesters broke into the compound and smashed up vehicles during the broader Yellow vests movement.

Personal life
Griveaux is married to Julia Minkowski, a lawyer. They have three children.

References

External links

1977 births
Living people
Sciences Po alumni
HEC Paris alumni
People from Saône-et-Loire
La République En Marche! politicians
Deputies of the 15th National Assembly of the French Fifth Republic
Government spokespersons of France
Members of Parliament for Paris